Where Words Fail (Spanish:Donde mueren las palabras) is a 1946 Argentine drama film directed by Hugo Fregonese and starring Enrique Muiño, Dario Garzay and Héctor Méndez. The film's sets were designed by the art directors Germán Gelpi and Mario Vanarelli

Cast
 Enrique Muiño  
 Dario Garzay    
 Héctor Méndez    
 Italo Bertini  
 Aurelia Ferrer   
 María Ruanova  
 René Múgica  
 Pablo Cumo  
 Linda Lorena   
 José A. Vázquez
 Milita Brandon

External links
 

1946 films
1946 drama films
Argentine drama films
1940s Spanish-language films
Argentine black-and-white films
Films directed by Hugo Fregonese
1940s Argentine films